{{Infobox artist
| name        = Carolyn Cole
| birth_name  =
| image       = Carolyn Cole.JPG
| image_size  =
| alt         =
| caption     = Cole speaks at Ohio University (2009)
| birth_date  = 
| birth_place =
| death_date  =
| death_place =
| education   = Bachelor of Arts from the University of Texas at AustinMaster of Arts from Ohio University
| title       = Staff photographer for the Los Angeles Times
| spouse      =
| parents     =
| children    =
| website     = 
}}

Carolyn Cole (born April 24, 1961) is a staff photographer for the Los Angeles Times. She won the Pulitzer Prize for Feature Photography in 2004 for her coverage of the siege of Monrovia in 2003, the capital of Liberia.

Education
Cole graduated from the University of Texas in 1983 with a bachelor of arts, majoring in photojournalism. She earned a master of arts from the School of Visual Communication in the Scripps College of Communication at Ohio University.

Career beginnings
She began her career in 1986 as a staff photographer with the El Paso Herald-Post, a position which she occupied until 1988. She then moved to the San Francisco Examiner for two years, before spending another two years as a freelance photographer in Mexico City, working with newspapers such as the Los Angeles Times, Detroit Free Press, and Business Week. In 1992, Cole returned to being a staff photographer, working for The Sacramento Bee, before moving to the Times in 1994.

Recognitions
In 1994, the same year she moved to the Times, she was recognized in their editorial awards for her pictures of the crisis in Haiti. The following year, she was recognized again, this time for her work in Russia. In 1997, she gained attention for her photographs of dying bank robber Emil Mătăsăreanu, who had been shot after a nationally televised shootout with police. Her evidence was used in the wrongful death lawsuit filed by his family. Her pictures also helped the Times win a Pulitzer Prize for its coverage of the event. Later that year, she was named Journalist of the Year by the Times Mirror Corporation. In 2002, she received the National Press Photographers Association Newspaper Photographer of the Year award for the first time. In mid-2003, Cole went to Liberia, as rebels surrounded the capital, Monrovia, demanding the resignation of President Charles Taylor. This trip was to earn her the 2004 Pulitzer Prize, "for her cohesive, behind-the-scenes look at the effects of civil war in Liberia, with special attention to innocent citizens caught in the conflict." She won the 2003 George Polk Award for photojournalism.

In 2004, Cole was named both NPPA Newspaper Photographer of the Year for a second time, for her work in both Liberia and Iraq, and the Pictures of the Year International Newspaper Photographer by the University of Missouri's Missouri School of Journalism. This made her the first person ever to win all three of America's top photojournalism awards in the same year. During the year, she also spent time in Haiti, witnessing the fall of the regime of Jean-Bertrand Aristide.
Cole has also received the Robert Capa Gold Medal from the Overseas Press Club in both 2003 and 2004, and won two World Press Photo awards in 2004.

In 2007, she won the NPPA Newspaper Photographer of the Year.

Arrest
In April 2000, Cole was arrested on felony charges for "throwing deadly missiles" at police during protests in Miami's "Little Havana" during the Elián González affair. Cole and the Times denied the charges, which were later dropped.

Pulitzer Prize nomination
Cole spent time in Kosovo during the 1999 crisis, and in 2001, spent two months in Afghanistan. In 2002, Cole covered the beginnings of the prominent siege of Bethlehem's Church of the Nativity, which had been occupied by Palestinian militants. Then, on May 2, she made a last-minute decision to join a group of peace activists who entered the building in solidarity with the Palestinians. Over the nine days that followed, she doubled as a news reporter for the Times, filing several stories. She was the only photojournalist in the building itself. The pictures she took earned her a nomination for the 2003 Pulitzer Prize.

References

External links
Cole's Pulitzer Prize-winning photo series, at pulitzer.org
"Haiti: Coping with the aftermath", The Los Angeles Times'', 2010

American photojournalists
1961 births
Living people
Artists from Los Angeles
Photographers from California
George Polk Award recipients
Pulitzer Prize for Feature Photography winners
Moody College of Communication alumni
Los Angeles Times people
20th-century American photographers
21st-century American photographers
20th-century American women photographers
21st-century American women photographers
Women photojournalists